The Battle of Annan, also known in the sources as the Camisade of Annan, took place on 16 December 1332 at Annan, Dumfries and Galloway in Scotland.

Edward Balliol had seized the Scottish crown three months earlier after the Battle of Dupplin Moor (10–11 August 1332). In October 1332, Sir Archibald Douglas, Guardian of Scotland made a truce with Balliol, supposedly to let the Scottish Parliament assemble and decide who their true king was. Emboldened by the truce, Balliol dismissed most of his English troops and moved to Annan on the north shore of the Solway Firth. He issued two public letters saying that with the help of England he had reclaimed his kingdom and acknowledged that Scotland had always been a fief of England. He also promised land for Edward III on the border, including Berwick-on-Tweed, and that he would serve Edward for the rest of his life.

In the early morning hours of 16 December 1332 Bruce loyalists led by Sir Archibald Douglas, John Randolph, 3rd Earl of Moray, Robert Stewart, and Simon Fraser made a surprise attacked on Balliol. Most of Balliol's men were killed, though he himself managed to escape through a hole in the wall and fled naked on horse to Carlisle, England. Edward's brother Henry Balliol died as a result of injuries sustained at the battle of Annan. The death of Henry ended the Balliol Scot dynasty as Edward Balliol died childless in 1364.

Robert Stewart, the future King Robert II of Scotland, was sixteen years old at the Battle of Annan. The Bruce loyalists were supporters of eight year old King David II of Scotland, son of Robert the Bruce who had died on 7 June 1329.

References
Liber Pluscardensis, ed. Skene, Edinburgh 1880. https://archive.org/details/liberpluscarden01unkngoog]
  https://www.stirling.gov.uk/tourism-visitors/stirlings-history/wallace-bruce-rob-roy-macgreagor/the-second-war/

Battles involving Scotland
1332 in Scotland
Battles of the Wars of Scottish Independence
Conflicts in 1332
Battle